This is a list of lighthouses in Uruguay.

Lighthouses

See also
 Lists of lighthouses and lightvessels

References

External links

 

Uruguay
Lighthouses of Uruguay
lighthouses of Uruguay